The Catawban, or Eastern Siouan, languages form a small language family in east North America.  The Catawban family is a branch of the larger Siouan a.k.a. Siouan–Catawban family.

Family division

The Catawban family consists of two languages:
 Catawba  (†) – spoken by the Catawba people
 Woccon  (†) – spoken by the Waccamaw people

Both are now extinct. They were not closely related.

References

 Parks, Douglas R.; & Rankin, Robert L. (2001). The Siouan languages. In R. J. DeMallie (Ed.), Handbook of North American Indians: Plains (Vol. 13, Part 1, pp. 94–114). W. C. Sturtevant (Gen. Ed.). Washington, D.C.: Smithsonian Institution. .

 
Catawba
Indigenous languages of the North American Southeast
Languages of the United States
Extinct languages of North America